is a railway station in the city Nikkō, Tochigi, Japan, operated by the East Japan Railway Company (JR East).

Lines

Station layout
The station consists of two opposed side platforms, connected to the station building by a footbridge. The station is unattended.

Platforms

History
Fubasami Station opened on 1 June 1890. On 1 April 1987 the station came under the control of JR East with the privatization of Japanese National Railways (JNR).

Surrounding area
 
 Cedar Avenue of Nikkō

See also
 List of railway stations in Japan

External links

 JR East Station information 

Railway stations in Tochigi Prefecture
Nikkō Line
Stations of East Japan Railway Company
Railway stations in Japan opened in 1890
Nikkō, Tochigi